M.O are an English girl group consisting of members Annie Ashcroft and Chanal Benjilali, and previously Frankee Connolly until her departure in June 2017 and Nadine Samuels until her departure in 2020. The group was formed in 2012 by the members themselves, after their previous groups Mini Viva and Duchess had disbanded. Starting out on independent label Operator Records, they have been signed to Polydor Records since early 2016. On 19 October 2020, Nadine Samuels confirmed her departure from the group.

Career

Beginnings
Frankee Connolly was a part of Mini Viva until the duo's split in 2010, where as Nadine Samuels and Annie Ashcroft were both members of the girl group Duchess until 2012.
M.O was formed in late 2012, after Connolly had met Samuels and Ashcroft at music industry events.
M.O stands for Modus Operandi, which is a Latin term for "a particular way to do something" 
M.O's initial aim was to bring old school 90s music back, naming old school  TLC, J.Lo, Aaliyah and, All Saints as an inspiration amongst others.

M.O made their debut as a band with a remix of Brandy and Monica's "The Boy Is Mine"  on the YouTube channel SB.TV in 2012. At this point they received positive feedback from the music industry and were championed by the likes of Ed Sheeran.
They followed up their debut on YouTube with their first promotional single "Wait Your Turn", which was followed by other releases in 2013, including "Ain't Got Time" and "Hot".

In early 2014, M.O announced that the Jess Glynne-penned track "For a Minute" would be released as their official debut single. It was released in April 2014 and entered the UK Indie Charts at number 6. In May, the group joined Little Mix as the main support act on their sold out Salute Tour, and performed at numerous festivals in the UK, including Wireless festival. In August, they released their garage-influenced second single "Dance On My Own", which entered the UK Sales Chart at number 49. Also in 2014, the group was nominated for a MOBO Award in the Best Newcomer category.

In 2015, the single "Preach", which was co-written by Starsmith and Joel Compass, was released. The same year, they signed a record deal with Polydor Records and released the promotional single "Love the Most", a collaboration with The HeavyTrackerz. In 2016, M.O released the extended plays Good Friends and Who Do You Think Of?, the latter of which spawned a single of the same name. "Who Do You Think Of?" reached the top twenty of the UK Singles Chart, becoming their highest-charting single yet. The song was certified silver and sold over 375,000 copies. In July 2016, it was announced that the band signed a US deal with Interscope Records. Their next single, "Not in Love", featured rapper Kent Jones and was released in December 2016, peaking just outside the top 40 at No. 42.

On 26 June 2020, the group released the EP Modus Operandi, featuring tracks such as "Who Do You Think Of", "Ex at the Party" and "Going Out of My Way" featuring Mr Eazi.

Line-up changes
After a quiet 18 months, including the departure of Connolly, the group made a comeback with their new single "Bad Vibe", featuring Lotto Boyzz and Mr Eazi. It peaked at number 18 on the UK Singles Chart.

On 26 November 2018, Nadine Samuels was imprisoned for eight months for causing death by careless driving.

During 2020, founding member Nadine Samuels left the group.

Final single & split
In October 2021, M.O released their first single since the COVID-19 pandemic, ‘U No’ with producer collective Jodapac and British rapper French the Kid. 

In September 2022, band member Chanal Benjilali revealed via Instagram Q&A that the group had been inactive for a while after the release of U No and that it was very unlikely that fans can expect new music anytime soon.

Discography

Extended plays

Singles

As lead artists

As featured artists

Promotional singles

Awards and nominations

Notes

References

British contemporary R&B musical groups
English girl groups
English vocal groups
Musical groups established in 2012
Musical groups from London
Polydor Records artists
Interscope Records artists